Kuranakh-Sala (Kuraanax Salaa) is a rural locality (a selo) in Sordonnokhsky Rural Okrug of Oymyakonsky District in the Sakha Republic, Russia, located  from Ust-Nera, the administrative center of the district, and  from Orto-Balagan, the administrative center of the rural okrug. Its population as of the 2002 Census was 19.

References

Notes

Sources
Official website of the Sakha Republic. Registry of the Administrative-Territorial Divisions of the Sakha Republic. Oymyakonsky District. 

Rural localities in Oymyakonsky District